Devendranath, is one of the Hindu saints, a shishya student of Navnath Sampradaya. His original name is Vijaykumar Sakharam Sule and his diksha name is Devendranath more popularly known as Sule Baba amongst locals. He was more active in Ahmednagar district of Maharashtra. Raghavendra Swami (Manthralayam, Andhra Pradesh) was his guru.

Devendra Nath was a blend of modernism and spiritualism. Devendranath also formulated "Nav Dhyaan Yoga" technique believed to help in a quicker progress to achieve "Nir Vikalpa Samadhi" in a comparatively shorter span. The technique consists of 9 simple steps.

He performed "Shiv Yaag" in Madhi which was believed to be performed by none after Gurudev Machhindranath (founder of Nath Panth) himself.  He started the "Alakh Niranjan" magazine which was a medium to impart knowledge to the true seekers of divinity.

In his later days he was blessed by a "Samrasya Siddhi" a highest siddhi/stage in its own amongst the nath panthi siddhis. He took Samadhi on 3 May 1982. His Samadhi mandir is next to Kanifnath Temple in Madhi. His followers have built a beautiful ashram which can be easily noticed from Shri Kanifnath temple. They conduct rituals every Amavasya at the Madhi Shrine under the able guidance of current peethadhipati Shri Khagendra Nathji (current peethadhipati).

External links
 http://www.devendranathmaharaj.com/
 https://web.archive.org/web/20120118020339/http://www.devendranathmadhi.org/
 http://shridevendranath.blogspot.in/
 https://www.facebook.com/Devendranathmadhi/

20th-century Hindu religious leaders